In theoretical chemistry, the Buckingham potential is a formula proposed by Richard Buckingham which describes the Pauli exclusion principle and van der Waals energy  for the interaction of two atoms that are not directly bonded as a function of the interatomic distance . It is a variety of interatomic potentials.

Buckingham proposed this as a simplification of the Lennard-Jones potential, in a theoretical study of the equation of state for gaseous helium, neon and argon.

As explained in Buckingham's original paper and, e.g., in section 2.2.5 of Jensen's text, the repulsion is due to the interpenetration of the closed electron shells. "There is therefore some justification for choosing the repulsive part (of the potential) as an exponential function". The Buckingham potential has been used extensively in simulations of molecular dynamics.

Because the exponential term converges to a constant as →, while the  term diverges, the Buckingham potential becomes attractive as  becomes small. This may be problematic when dealing with a structure with very short interatomic distances, as any nuclei that cross a certain threshold will become strongly (and unphysically) bound to one another at a distance of zero.

Modified Buckingham (Exp-Six) potential 
The modified Buckingham potential, also called the "exp-six" potential, is used to calculate the interatomic forces for gases based on Chapman and Cowling collision theory. The potential has the form

Coulomb–Buckingham potential

The Coulomb–Buckingham potential is an extension of the Buckingham potential for application to ionic systems (e.g. ceramic materials). The formula for the interaction is

where A, B, and C are suitable constants and the additional term is the electrostatic potential energy.

The above equation may be written in its alternate form as

Beest Kramer van Santen (BKS) potential 
The BKS potential is a force field that may be used to simulate the interatomic potential between Silica glass atoms. Rather than relying only on experimental data, the BKS potential is derived by combining ab initio quantum chemistry methods on small silica clusters to describe accurate interaction between nearest-neighbors, which is the function of accurate force field. The experimental data is applied to fit larger scale force information beyond nearest neighbors. By combining the microscopic and macroscopic information, the applicability of the BKS potential has been extended to both the silica polymorphs and other tetrahedral network oxides systems systems that have same cluster structure, such as aluminophosphates, carbon and silicon.

The form of this interatomic potential is the usual Buckingham form, with the addition of a Coulomb force term. The formula for the BKS potential is expressed as

 

The BKS potential parameters for common atoms are shown below:

An updated version of the BKS potential introduced a new repulsive term to prevent atom overlapping. The modified potential is taken as

where the constant parameters  were chosen to have the following values for Silica glass:

References

External links
Buckingham potential on SklogWiki

Theoretical chemistry
Computational chemistry
Thermodynamics
Chemical bonding
Intermolecular forces
Quantum mechanical potentials